KWMR (90.5 FM) is a community radio station licensed to Point Reyes Station, California, United States. It also broadcasts from Bolinas, California and Lagunitas, California with two translators.

Translators

See also
List of community radio stations in the United States

External links
Official website

WMR
Community radio stations in the United States
Bolinas, California
Mass media in Marin County, California